Ultimate Fixer was part of a spyware program that impersonated Windows Security Center.

Ultimate Fixer, along with Ultimate Cleaner and Ultimate Defender, were fake security programs for Windows.

Scareware